L'ivrogne corrigé (The Drunkard Reformed) is an opera by the composer Christoph Willibald Gluck. It takes the form of an opéra comique in two acts. The French-language libretto is by Louis Anseaume and Lourdet de Sarterre. The opera premiered in April 1760 at the Burgtheater in Vienna.

The work was recorded in Paris in 1950 with Jean-Christophe Benoît (Mathurin), Bernard Demigny (Lucas), Claudine Collart (Colette), Freda Betti (Mathurine) and Jean Hoffmann (Cléon / Pluton), conducted by René Leibowitz.

Roles

Sources
Holden, Amanda The Viking Opera Guide (Viking, 1993), page 374.
Gluck Gesamtausgabe L'ivrogne corrigé

1760 operas
French-language operas
Operas by Christoph Willibald Gluck
Opera world premieres at the Burgtheater
Operas